Vladislav is a market town in Třebíč District in the Vysočina Region of the Czech Republic. It has about 1,200 inhabitants.

Administrative parts
Villages of Hostákov and Střížov are administrative parts of Vladislav.

References

Populated places in Třebíč District
Market towns in the Czech Republic